East Brent is a village and civil parish, on the eastern edge of a hill that dominates the surrounding level countryside—Brent Knoll—close to the M5 motorway,  west of Axbridge, in the Sedgemoor district of the county of Somerset, in the south-west of England. The parish includes the hamlets of Rooksbridge, where the A38 road crosses the Mark Yeo and Edingworth.

History
The manor formed part of the great Saxon estate of Brent given by King Ine of the West Saxons to Glastonbury Abbey in 693 and held by the monks of the abbey until the Dissolution of the monasteries in 1539. It was then granted to the Duke of Somerset and subsequently passed to the Whitmores and then the Pophams, who lived in the Grade II listed Beaconsfield House until it was sold in 2015.

East Brent was part of the hundred of Brent-cum-Wrington.

Abbot John Selwood built a mansion in the village in the 15th century, which was demolished in 1708.

In 1851 George Anthony Denison was preferred to the valuable living of East Brent, and in the same year was made Archdeacon of Taunton. He was responsible for establishing the annual Harvest Home festival in the village.

Governance
The parish council has responsibility for local issues, including setting an annual precept (local rate) to cover the council's operating costs and producing annual accounts for public scrutiny. The parish council evaluates local planning applications and works with the local police, district council officers, and neighbourhood watch groups on matters of crime, security, and traffic. The parish council's role also includes initiating projects for the maintenance and repair of parish facilities, as well as consulting with the district council on the maintenance, repair, and improvement of highways, drainage, footpaths, public transport, and street cleaning. Conservation matters (including trees and listed buildings) and environmental issues are also the responsibility of the council.

The village falls within the Non-metropolitan district of Sedgemoor, which was formed on 1 April 1974 under the Local Government Act 1972, having previously been part of Axbridge Rural District, which is responsible for local planning and building control, local roads, council housing, environmental health, markets and fairs, refuse collection and recycling, cemeteries and crematoria, leisure services, parks, and tourism.

Somerset County Council is responsible for running the largest and most expensive local services such as education, social services, libraries, main roads, public transport, policing and fire services, trading standards, waste disposal and strategic planning.

It is also part of the Wells county constituency represented in the House of Commons of the Parliament of the United Kingdom. It elects one Member of Parliament (MP) by the first past the post system of election, and was part of the South West England constituency of the European Parliament prior to Britain leaving the European Union in January 2020, which elected seven MEPs using the d'Hondt method of party-list proportional representation.

Church and chapel

The parish Church of St Mary the Blesséd Virgin was built in the 15th century and was restored in the 19th century with a chancel by William Butterfield. It is a Grade I listed building. The church has a 15th-century eagle lectern and pulpit from 1634.

Charles Fane de Salis was the vicar in the late 19th century, before becoming Suffragan Bishop of Taunton.

A Baptist Chapel was erected in 1852 and last used for worship in 1955 before being converted into a private house.

References

External links

 East Brent Parish Council
 Rooksbridge and East Brent

Villages in Sedgemoor
Civil parishes in Somerset